Grombalia Sports is a Tunisian football club, based in the city of Grombalia in north-east Tunisia. Founded in 1939, the team plays in white and blue colors.

The club currently plays in Tunisian Ligue Professionnelle 2.

Stadium
Their ground is Stade municipal de Grombalia, which has a capacity of 3,000.

League participations
Tunisian Ligue Professionnelle 1: 2013–2014
Tunisian Ligue Professionnelle 2: ????–2013

Managers
Hassan Gabsi (Nov 14, 2012 – July 19, 2013)
Robertinho (July 21, 2013 – Jan 8, 2014)
Patrick Liewig (Jan 8, 2014 – Feb 16, 2014)
Hassen Gabsi (Feb 17, 2014–)

References

External links
Stade Municipal
Club logo

Football clubs in Tunisia
Association football clubs established in 1939
1939 establishments in Tunisia
Sports clubs in Tunisia